Find Me Guilty is a 2006 American courtroom comedy-drama film co-written and directed by Sidney Lumet. The film is based on the true story of the longest Mafia trial in American history. Much of the courtroom testimony was taken from the original court transcripts. Vin Diesel stars as Jackie DiNorscio, a New Jersey mobster who is on trial with 19 of his colleagues for racketeering. A wrench is thrown into the system when DiNorscio fires his lawyer and decides to represent himself. The film also stars Peter Dinklage, Linus Roache, Alex Rocco, and Ron Silver.

Plot
In the mid 1980s, Mafia soldier Jackie DiNorscio (Vin Diesel) and 19 of his peers have been waiting a year for their federal racketeering trial to begin. While out on bail, Jackie is shot by his drug addict cousin Tony Compagna (Raúl Esparza). Afraid of being killed by the extended mob family run by Nick Calabrese (Alex Rocco), Tony agrees to be a government witness for district attorney Sean Kierney (Linus Roache). Shortly after, Jackie is arrested and sentenced to 22–30 years in prison after being set up in an unrelated drug sting by the DEA. Kierney tries to pressure Jackie into cooperating with the government against his codefendants in order to get an early release date, but Jackie flatly refuses.

Upset over the results of his previous trial, Jackie fires his lawyer and decides to represent himself. This adds to the burdens of the court, already having to deal with 20 defendants and their lawyers. Judge Sidney Finestein (Ron Silver) strongly advises against it, but lead defense attorney Ben Klandis (Peter Dinklage) agrees to assist Jackie. Both Klandis and Kierney recognize Jackie's ability to charm the jury, but his arrogant, vulgar behavior eventually starts irritating everyone. As revenge, Kierney arranges for Jackie to have all of his prison privileges revoked. No one is more upset than Nick, who believes Jackie will cost them the trial and threatens to sever himself from the case. As weeks turn into months, the court case evolves into a marathon affair. Kierney wants Jackie kicked off the case, but Judge Finestein reluctantly agrees to keep the trial going. Jackie realizes he has gone too far and apologizes to the judge.

Wanting to remove the possibility that even one defendant gets acquitted, Kearny offers a final plea deal to all the defendants. In return for pleading guilty, they will all get shorter sentences than they would be facing if found guilty. Jackie tells his codefendants that he refuses to take a deal even though he is already serving a long sentence for drug trafficking. This convinces Nick and the others to turn down the deal too. The final witness is Jackie's cousin Tony. Klandis is able to use Tony's heavy drug use to discredit him as a witness and Jackie emotionally cross-examines his cousin and asks why he betrayed his love for him.

After 21 months of testimony, the trial concludes with closing arguments. The prosecution and defense teams return to their homes expecting the jury to deliberate for at least a week. However, after only 14 hours of deliberation the jury returns a verdict of not guilty on all charges. While the rest of the defendants leave the courtroom with their families, Jackie returns to prison to finish his sentence. He receives a hero's welcome at the correctional facility, where fellow prisoners chant his name and reach out to shake his hand.

The end title cards explain that the real Jackie DiNorscio served 17 and a half years before being paroled in 2002. He died of natural causes during filming.

Cast

 Vin Diesel as Jackie DiNorscio
 Peter Dinklage as Ben Klandis
 Linus Roache as Sean Kierney (Samuel Alito)
 Ron Silver as Judge Sidney Finestein
 Annabella Sciorra as Bella DiNorscio
 Alex Rocco as Nick Calabrese (Anthony Accetturo)
 Jerry Adler as Rizzo
 Raúl Esparza as Tony Compagna
 Richard Portnow as Max Novardis
 Aleksa Palladino as Marina DiNorscio
 Robert Stanton as Chris Newberger
 Marcia Jean Kurtz as Sara Stiles
 Domenick Lombardozzi as Jerry McQueen
 Josh Pais as Harry Bellman
 Peter McRobbie as Peter Petraki
 Chuck Cooper as James Washington
 Frank Pietrangolare as Carlo Mascarpone (Michael Taccetta)
 Richard DeDomenico as Tom "Nappy" Napoli
 Jerry Grayson as Jimmy "The Jew" Katz
 Tony Ray Rossi as Joe Bellini
 Vinny Vella as Graziedei
 Paul Borghese as Gino Mascarpone (Martin Taccetta)
 Frank Adonis as Phil Radda
 Nick Puccio as Alessandro Tedeschi
 Frankie Perrone as Henry Fiuli
 Salvatore Paul Piro as Mike Belaggio
 James Biberi as Frank Brentano
 Oscar A. Colon as Pissaro
 Ben Lipitz as Henry Kelsey
 Steven Randazzo as Chris Cellano
 Gerry Vichi as Theodore
 Louis Guss as Court Clerk
 Gene Ruffini as Giacomo DiNorscio, Sr.
 Roger Zamudio as Octavio Juarez
 Terry Serpico as Michael Kerry
 Mark Kachersky as Agent Brandon
 Frank Lentini as Charley Kraus
 Antoni Corone as Detective
 Dennis Paladino as Sylvester
 David Brown as US Marshall #1
 Louis Mustillo as US Marshall #2
 John DiBenedetto as Jesse
 Eddie Marrero as Guard

Reception
Find Me Guilty received mostly positive reviews. , the film holds a 62% approval rating on review aggregate Rotten Tomatoes, based on 106 reviews with an average rating of 6.02 out of 10. The critical consensus is: "Find Me Guiltys excessive length and heavy-handed narrative keep it from reaching its full potential, but Vin Diesel's performance is well worth watching."

Roger Ebert gave the film three out of four stars, calling Diesel "a good choice for this role, bringing it sincerity without nobility." Ebert also praised the film's director, Lumet, who "was able to see the serious dramatic potential of Vin Diesel, dismissed as an action star, and use it for a remarkable performance."

Box office
The film did poorly at the box office; on its first weekend, it grossed only $608,804 (439 theaters, averaging $1,386 per theater). It grossed $1,173,643 in the domestic market, and $1,457,700 overseas, for a total of $2,631,343. The film's budget was $13 million, and so it was considered a box office bomb.

Release
Find Me Guilty was released in theatres on March 17, 2006. The film was released on DVD on June 27, 2006. The film was released on Blu-ray in Spain on August 31, 2011 and in the United States on October 9, 2012.

Actual events
In August 1985, authorities in New Jersey indicted Anthony Accetturo, Martin and Michael Taccetta, and eighteen of the men who ran the New Jersey faction of the New York-based Lucchese crime family. It was the first time in New Jersey history that an entire organized crime family had been indicted in one prosecution. However, this crime family proved to be only a faction of the Lucchese crime family, only operating in New Jersey. But due to the crew's membership and 20 defendants, U.S. law enforcement recognized the crew as its own crime family.

The case went to trial in November 1986, based on a 65-page indictment. It started in March 1987 at the federal courthouse in Newark. It ended on August 26, 1988. The U.S. Clerk’s Office in Newark confirmed that officially The United States v. Anthony Accetturo et al. was the longest criminal case on record in the federal courts of the nation.

The jury found a verdict of not guilty in favor of all the defendants. The trial followed a ten-year investigation and generated 240 volumes and 850 exhibits of evidence. It cost taxpayers millions of dollars, and was the result of a 76 count Racketeer Influenced and Corrupt Organizations Act (RICO) indictment.

See also
 List of American films of 2006
 The Jersey Crew

References

External links
 
 
 
 
 
 
 
 
 Find Me Guilty at Screen It!

2006 films
2000s crime comedy-drama films
American courtroom films
American crime comedy-drama films
American films based on actual events
Biographical films about gangsters
2000s English-language films
Juries in fiction
Films directed by Sidney Lumet
Films produced by Robert Greenhut
Films set in New York City
Films set in the 1980s
Films shot in New Jersey
Films shot in Newark, New Jersey
Mafia comedy films
One Race Films films
2000s American films